John Baber (1593–1644) was an English lawyer and politician who sat in the House of Commons  between 1628 and 1640.

Baber was the son of John Baber DD of Tormarton, Gloucestershire. He matriculated at Lincoln College, Oxford on 15 April 1608, aged 15 and was awarded BA on 22 May 1611. He was called to the bar at Lincoln's Inn in 1621 and became recorder of Wells.  In 1628, Baber was elected Member of Parliament for Wells and sat until 1629 when King Charles decided to rule without parliament for eleven years. 

Baber became a bencher in 1639. In April 1640, he was re-elected MP for Wells in the Short Parliament.

Baber died in 1644, aged 50.

References

 

1593 births
1644 deaths
Alumni of Lincoln College, Oxford
English lawyers
17th-century English lawyers
Members of Lincoln's Inn
English MPs 1628–1629
English MPs 1640 (April)
People from Wells, Somerset
People from Tormarton